The Ust-Orda Buryat Constituency (No.220) was a Russian legislative constituency in Ust-Orda Buryat Autonomous Okrug in 1993–2007. In 2008 Ust-Orda Buryat AO was merged with Irkutsk Oblast, so currently territories of former Ust-Orda Buryat constituency are now parts of Irkutsk and Angarsk constituencies of Irkutsk Oblast.

Members elected

Election results

1993

|-
! colspan=2 style="background-color:#E9E9E9;text-align:left;vertical-align:top;" |Candidate
! style="background-color:#E9E9E9;text-align:left;vertical-align:top;" |Party
! style="background-color:#E9E9E9;text-align:right;" |Votes
! style="background-color:#E9E9E9;text-align:right;" |%
|-
|style="background-color:"|
|align=left|Sergey Boskholov
|align=left|Independent
|
|70.96%
|-
|style="background-color:"|
|align=left|Appolon Ivanov
|align=left|Independent
| - 
|17.18%
|-
| colspan="5" style="background-color:#E9E9E9;"|
|- style="font-weight:bold"
| colspan="3" style="text-align:left;" | Total
| 
| 100%
|-
| colspan="5" style="background-color:#E9E9E9;"|
|- style="font-weight:bold"
| colspan="4" |Source:
|
|}

1995

|-
! colspan=2 style="background-color:#E9E9E9;text-align:left;vertical-align:top;" |Candidate
! style="background-color:#E9E9E9;text-align:left;vertical-align:top;" |Party
! style="background-color:#E9E9E9;text-align:right;" |Votes
! style="background-color:#E9E9E9;text-align:right;" |%
|-
|style="background-color:#23238E"|
|align=left|Sergey Boskholov (incumbent)
|align=left|Our Home – Russia
|
|43.05%
|-
|style="background-color:"|
|align=left|Valery Maleyev
|align=left|Independent
|
|30.83%
|-
|style="background-color:"|
|align=left|Aleksandr Nechukhayev
|align=left|Independent
|
|15.47%
|-
|style="background-color:"|
|align=left|Sergey Semenov
|align=left|Liberal Democratic Party
|
|3.48%
|-
|style="background-color:#000000"|
|colspan=2 |against all
|
|5.57%
|-
| colspan="5" style="background-color:#E9E9E9;"|
|- style="font-weight:bold"
| colspan="3" style="text-align:left;" | Total
| 
| 100%
|-
| colspan="5" style="background-color:#E9E9E9;"|
|- style="font-weight:bold"
| colspan="4" |Source:
|
|}

1999

|-
! colspan=2 style="background-color:#E9E9E9;text-align:left;vertical-align:top;" |Candidate
! style="background-color:#E9E9E9;text-align:left;vertical-align:top;" |Party
! style="background-color:#E9E9E9;text-align:right;" |Votes
! style="background-color:#E9E9E9;text-align:right;" |%
|-
|style="background-color:"|
|align=left|Valery Kuzin
|align=left|Independent
|
|49.08%
|-
|style="background-color:#23238E"|
|align=left|Sergey Boskholov (incumbent)
|align=left|Our Home – Russia
|
|24.85%
|-
|style="background-color:"|
|align=left|Ivan Ivanov
|align=left|Communist Party
|
|8.76%
|-
|style="background-color:"|
|align=left|Yevgeny Bardakhanov
|align=left|Independent
|
|4.60%
|-
|style="background-color:"|
|align=left|Igor Shpakov
|align=left|Independent
|
|3.92%
|-
|style="background-color:#FF4400"|
|align=left|Vladimir Tarasov
|align=left|Andrey Nikolayev and Svyatoslav Fyodorov Bloc
|
|1.32%
|-
|style="background-color:"|
|align=left|Oleg Batorov
|align=left|Independent
|
|1.31%
|-
|style="background-color:"|
|align=left|Maksim Batorov
|align=left|Independent
|
|0.55%
|-
|style="background-color:#000000"|
|colspan=2 |against all
|
|3.92%
|-
| colspan="5" style="background-color:#E9E9E9;"|
|- style="font-weight:bold"
| colspan="3" style="text-align:left;" | Total
| 
| 100%
|-
| colspan="5" style="background-color:#E9E9E9;"|
|- style="font-weight:bold"
| colspan="4" |Source:
|
|}

2003

|-
! colspan=2 style="background-color:#E9E9E9;text-align:left;vertical-align:top;" |Candidate
! style="background-color:#E9E9E9;text-align:left;vertical-align:top;" |Party
! style="background-color:#E9E9E9;text-align:right;" |Votes
! style="background-color:#E9E9E9;text-align:right;" |%
|-
|style="background-color:"|
|align=left|Valery Kuzin (incumbent)
|align=left|Independent
|
|46.40%
|-
|style="background-color:"|
|align=left|Aleksandr Terentyev
|align=left|Independent
|
|22.87%
|-
|style="background-color:"|
|align=left|Sergey Boskholov
|align=left|Independent
|
|18.18%
|-
|style="background-color:"|
|align=left|Vladimir Zverev
|align=left|United Russia
|
|5.03%
|-
|style="background-color:"|
|align=left|Yevgeny Mityukov
|align=left|Independent
|
|1.16%
|-
|style="background-color:"|
|align=left|Nikolay Kizimov
|align=left|People's Patriotic Party
|
|1.08%
|-
|style="background-color:#00A1FF"|
|align=left|Dmitry Tabikhanov
|align=left|Party of Russia's Rebirth-Russian Party of Life
|
|0.74%
|-
|style="background-color:"|
|align=left|Aleksandr Stashin
|align=left|Independent
|
|0.19%
|-
|style="background-color:#000000"|
|colspan=2 |against all
|
|2.62%
|-
| colspan="5" style="background-color:#E9E9E9;"|
|- style="font-weight:bold"
| colspan="3" style="text-align:left;" | Total
| 
| 100%
|-
| colspan="5" style="background-color:#E9E9E9;"|
|- style="font-weight:bold"
| colspan="4" |Source:
|
|}

2006

|-
! colspan=2 style="background-color:#E9E9E9;text-align:left;vertical-align:top;" |Candidate
! style="background-color:#E9E9E9;text-align:left;vertical-align:top;" |Party
! style="background-color:#E9E9E9;text-align:right;" |Votes
! style="background-color:#E9E9E9;text-align:right;" |%
|-
|style="background-color:"|
|align=left|Valery Maleyev
|align=left|United Russia
|
|83.23%
|-
|style="background-color:"|
|align=left|Ivan Khrienko
|align=left|Independent
|
|6.82%
|-
|style="background-color:#000000"|
|colspan=2 |against all
|
|8.22%
|-
| colspan="5" style="background-color:#E9E9E9;"|
|- style="font-weight:bold"
| colspan="3" style="text-align:left;" | Total
| 
| 100%
|-
| colspan="5" style="background-color:#E9E9E9;"|
|- style="font-weight:bold"
| colspan="4" |Source:
|
|}

Notes

References

Obsolete Russian legislative constituencies
Politics of Ust-Orda Buryat Autonomous Okrug
Politics of Irkutsk Oblast